The 2020–21 Mestis season was the 21st season of Mestis, the second highest level of ice hockey in Finland after Liiga. Due to promotion/relegation games being cancelled due to COVID-19 pandemic in the last season both semi-finalists from last seasons Suomi-sarja (K-Espoo and FPS) were promoted to Mestis. Therefore this seasons consisted of 14 teams.

Clubs

Regular season
Initially the plan was to have each team play 50 games in total but due to the season being on hold from 2nd December 2020 to 10th February 2021 the teams were unable to play the full season. Due to this points-per-game determines the order of the teams. SaPKo and RoKi decided not to continue the season when it resumed in February 2021.

Top six advanced straight to the quarter-finals, while teams between 7th and 10th positions played a wild card round for the final two spots. Since the highest series of Finnish hockey is a closed series no team will be promoted to Liiga.

Rules for classification: 1) Points-per-game; 2) Goal difference; 3) Goals scored; 4) Head-to-head points; 5) Penalty minutes.

Playoffs
Playoffs are being played in four stages. Each stage before the final is a best-of-3 series, with the final being a best-of-5 series. The teams are reseeded after the quarterfinals, so that the best team by regular season performance to make the semifinals faces the worst team in the semifinals.

Bracket

Wild-card round

Quarter-finals

Semi-finals

Bronze medal game

Finals

Ketterä wins the finals 3-2.

See also
 2020–21 Liiga season

References

Mestis seasons
Mestis
Mestis
Finland